Dolphin Island: A Story of the People of the Sea is a children's novel by Arthur C. Clarke first published in 1963.

Summary
Late one night (in the world of the future), a giant cargo hovership makes an emergency landing somewhere in the middle of the United States and an enterprising teenager named Johnny Clinton stows away on it. A few hours later, the craft crashes into the Pacific Ocean. The crew ("even the ship's cat") is offloaded onto lifeboats, leaving Johnny (who, as a stowaway, was not on the ship's manifest) adrift in the flotsam from the wreckage. His life is saved by the "People of the Sea"—dolphins. A school of these fantastic creatures guides him to an island on Australia's Great Barrier Reef. Johnny becomes involved with the work of a strange and fascinating research community where a brilliant professor tries to communicate with dolphins. Johnny learns skindiving and survives a typhoon—only to risk his life again, immediately afterwards, to get medical help for the people on the island.

See also
John C. Lilly, dolphin communication and psychedelics researcher

External links 
 

1963 British novels
1963 science fiction novels
Novels by Arthur C. Clarke
British science fiction novels
Victor Gollancz Ltd books
Children's novels about animals
Fiction about dolphins
Novels set in Queensland
British children's novels
1963 children's books